Mansureh-ye Kanin (also Romanized as Manşūreh-ye Kanīn; also known as Manşūreh-ye Fāẕel) is a village in Hoseyni Rural District, in the Central District of Shadegan County, Khuzestan Province, Iran. At the 2006 census, its population was 55, in 7 families.

References 

Populated places in Shadegan County